Warszawa Reduta Ordona railway station  is a railway station that lies between the Ochota and Wola districts of Warsaw, Poland. It serves the Warszawska Kolej Dojazdowa system and was built in 1974 when Warszawska Kolej Dojazdowa was realigned into the city centre along its present line.

References
Station article at kolej.one.pl

External links

Railway stations in Poland opened in 1974
Reduta Ordona
Railway stations served by Warszawska Kolej Dojazdowa
Ochota
Wola